MDIC may refer to:

 Malaysia Defence Industry Council, government agency of Malaysia
 Ministry of Development, Industry and Foreign Trade (Ministério do Desenvolvimento, Indústria, e Comércio Exterior), former ministry of Brazil